Kaba Gassama Cissokho (born 16 August 1997) is a Spanish handball player for Fleury Loiret and the Spanish national team.

Gassama's older brother Mamadou Gassama is also a handball player, and her other brother, Sekou Gassama, is a footballer.

References

External links

Living people
Sportspeople from Granollers
1997 births
Spanish female handball players
Handball players from Catalonia
Spanish people of Senegalese descent
Spanish sportspeople of African descent
Expatriate handball players
Spanish expatriate sportspeople in France
Competitors at the 2022 Mediterranean Games
Mediterranean Games gold medalists for Spain
Mediterranean Games medalists in handball
21st-century Spanish women